Paulino Bernabe may refer to:

 Paulino Bernabe Senior (1932–2007), Spanish luthier
 Paulino Bernabe II (born 1960), Spanish luthier